Connelly Creek is a stream in Alberta, Canada.

Connelly Creek has the name of the Connelly brothers, pioneer citizens.

See also
List of rivers of Alberta

References

Rivers of Alberta